Fisher Park Historic District is a national historic district in the Fisher Park neighborhood, Greensboro, Guilford County, North Carolina.  The district encompasses 541 contributing buildings, 2 contributing sites, and 44 contributing structures in a predominantly residential section of Greensboro.  The houses were largely built between the 1900s and 1930s and include notable examples of Queen Anne, Colonial Revival, Gothic Revival, American Foursquare, and Bungalow / American Craftsman-style architecture. Located in the district are the separately listed Dixon-Leftwich-Murphy House, John Marion Galloway House, Julian Price House, and Latham-Baker House.  Other notable buildings include the  First Presbyterian Church (1928), Holy Trinity Episcopal Church (1922), Gant-McAlister House (c. 1910–15), and A.J. Schlosser House (c. 1922).

It was listed on the National Register of Historic Places in 1992, with a boundary increase in 1996.

References

Historic districts on the National Register of Historic Places in North Carolina
Colonial Revival architecture in North Carolina
Gothic Revival architecture in North Carolina
Queen Anne architecture in North Carolina
Buildings and structures in Greensboro, North Carolina
National Register of Historic Places in Guilford County, North Carolina